The 1878 Atlantic hurricane season lasted from the summer through much of the fall. Records show that 1878 featured a relatively active hurricane season. A total of twelve storms were observed during the year. There were twelve tropical storms, eight hurricanes and two major hurricanes (Category 3+). However, in the absence of modern satellite and other remote-sensing technologies, only storms that affected populated land areas or encountered ships at sea were recorded, so the actual total could be higher. An undercount bias of zero to six tropical cyclones per year between 1851 and 1885 and zero to four per year between 1886 and 1910 has been estimated. Of the known 1878 cyclones, both Hurricane Three and Hurricane Four were first documented in 1995 by Jose Fernandez-Partagas and Henry Diaz, who also proposed large changes to the known tracks of Hurricanes Two, Seven and Eight. Further analysis from 2000 onwards extended the duration of Hurricane Three by one day and identified major track changes for Hurricane Five.



Season summary 

The Atlantic hurricane database (HURDAT) recognizes twelve tropical cyclones for 1878 in the Atlantic basin; two were tropical storms and ten were hurricanes. This season caused a total of 108 fatalities. The most notable hurricane of the 1878 Atlantic season was Hurricane Eleven or the Gale of 1878. This hurricane caused at least 72 fatalities in Cuba and the United States. Estimated damage from this storm amounted to $2 million.
The first storm of 1878 was Tropical Storm One, which formed in the Gulf of Mexico on July 1. It impacted Florida and weakened to a tropical depression over land but regained some intensity when it emerged into the Atlantic. It brought high winds and heavy rainfall as far as North Carolina. Hurricane Two grew from a tropical storm near the Leeward Islands to impact Mexico as a Category 1 hurricane on August 18. Hurricane Three was a Category 1 hurricane that existed in the mid-Atlantic from August 19 to August 21, when it dissipated over the Gulf of Saint Lawrence. Hurricane Four was first seen near the Bahamas on August 25. It tracked northeast and passed within 90 miles of Bermuda before dissipating in the mid-Atlantic on August 30. Hurricane Five hit the Leeward Islands on September 2, then Haiti and passed north of Cuba. It made landfall on the Florida peninsula as a tropical storm, moved offshore, strengthened and made another landfall near Tampa before passing over St Augustine on September 11. The storm caused several ship wrecks along the east coast of Florida. Hurricane Six was a Category 2 hurricane that existed in the western Atlantic between September 12 and September 18. Hurricane Seven is the only known Category 4 hurricane of 1878. It made landfall on Haiti as a Category 1 hurricane and rapidly weakened to a tropical storm but regained hurricane strength in the Atlantic. After passing through the Bahamas it grew to a Category 2 hurricane. It continued to grow, becoming a Category 3 hurricane on September 30 and reaching Category 4 strength by October 8. Hurricane Eight grew from a tropical storm in the Gulf of Mexico on October 9. It crossed over Florida and grew to a Category 1 hurricane as it tracked north off the US east coast. Hurricane Nine was a minimal Category 1 Hurricane that existed in the Atlantic between October 9 and October 16. Hurricane Ten also remained at sea throughout its entire duration between October 13 and October 19. Hurricane Eleven, or the Gale Of 1878, was the most destructive storm of the year. It first made landfall in Cuba at hurricane strength, then weakened before passing over Florida and the Bahamas. The storm again strengthened before making landfall in North Carolina. It dissipated over New York on October 24. Tropical Storm Twelve passed over the Lesser Antilles in late November before passing close to Puerto Rico and then dissipating near Jamaica on December 2.

Systems

Tropical Storm One 

On July 1 a tropical storm developed in the Gulf of Mexico off the Florida coast. It produced frequent rain, easterly wind, and diminishing pressure in Florida.
The storm likely briefly weakened to a tropical depression over Florida but emerged into the Atlantic Ocean that afternoon and quickly regained tropical storm status. Rainy weather with frequent easterly gales extended northward through South Carolina.

On July 3, easterly gales and rainy weather prevailed along the Atlantic coast as far north as Cape Hatteras. The tropical storm exited the coastal region on the afternoon of July 3, and no further records are, currently, known.

Hurricane Two 

A tropical storm was discovered in the vicinity of the Leeward Islands on August 8. It moved to the west across the Caribbean Sea and then to the northwest. By the time that it entered the Gulf of Mexico, the system had intensified into a hurricane. The storm moved west across the Gulf of Mexico, and maintained hurricane status until making landfall in Mexico on August 18. The hurricane had dissipated over Mexico by the next day.

Hurricane Three 

A Category One hurricane was first observed in the mid-Atlantic, north-east of Bermuda, on August 19. It moved to the north, toward Atlantic Canada. The hurricane grazed Nova Scotia shortly before it reached peak intensity. Sustained winds at peak intensity were  while the minimum central pressure was at 963 mbar, the most intense on record for a category 1 hurricane. It then grazed Newfoundland before it became extratropical in the Gulf of Saint Lawrence on August 21.

Hurricane Four 

A tropical storm was discovered in the vicinity of the Bahamas on August 25. It moved to the northeast early in its duration. By August 27 it strengthened into a hurricane. After this it steadily got stronger as it moved toward Bermuda. On August 28 it had been upgraded to a Category 2 hurricane. Near peak intensity it passed within  of Bermuda. The intensity of the storm barely leveled off over the next two days. The cyclone was last seen on August 30.

Hurricane Five 

A tropical storm was first observed on September 1 just north of South America. It moved to the west-northwest, becoming a hurricane before hitting the Leeward Islands on September 2. It continued across the Caribbean, hitting Haiti and paralleling the north coast of Cuba. By September 7 it had weakened to a tropical storm and was east of Key West, Florida. It made landfall, on the Florida peninsula, soon afterwards and began moving slowly north before drifting back offshore where it strengthened. It remained over Florida for three days due to slow movement. The center passed over St. Augustine on September 11. When it reached the western Atlantic it became a hurricane again and caused several ships to be wrecked along the north-east coast of Florida, between Cape Canaveral and Amelia Island. It hit South Carolina by the morning of September 12, and, becoming extratropical, reached Ontario (where, claiming at least 4 lives, it had been raining since September 10) by the morning of September 13. In Central Florida, the cyclone flooded the area near Fort Basinger, including the Kissimmee River valley, in present-day Okeechobee County. Very heavy rainfall along its path affected the Florida peninsula. The hurricane caused at least nine deaths, though some reports suggest more were likely.

Hurricane Six 

After several days it grew to a Category 2 hurricane with winds peaking at .The minimum pressure is unknown.

Hurricane Seven 

A tropical storm was first observed in the central Caribbean on September 24. It moved to the north, strengthening into a Category 1 hurricane before making landfall in Haiti. An American brigantine was wrecked at Tiburon with all hands lost. The storm rapidly regained hurricane status after emerging into the Atlantic. It passed through the eastern Bahamas shortly before it was upgraded to a Category 2 hurricane. Again it gradually strengthened, becoming a Category 3 hurricane by September 30 and a Category 4 hurricane by October 2. It continued to the northeast and moved away from land. The cyclone also maintained major hurricane status at a high latitude, roughly at 47.5N, but weakened somewhat before it was last seen on October 8.

Hurricane Eight 

A tropical storm formed in the Gulf of Mexico on October 9. It moved across Florida, and after tracking near the coasts of Georgia, South Carolina, and North Carolina, it strengthened to a hurricane. The storm brought heavy wind and rain to New England, causing 27 deaths.

Hurricane Nine 

A tropical storm was first discovered on October 9 in the mid-Atlantic. It strengthened into a minimal hurricane before it dissipated at sea on October 16. It is likely that Hurricane Eight and Hurricane Nine merged into a single, large extratropical storm on
October 16.

Hurricane Ten 

Hurricane Ten was a major hurricane that remained at sea during its entire duration. It was first discovered while a tropical storm of October 13. Over the next two days it strengthened slightly. By October 15 it became a hurricane and a Category 2 hurricane by the next day. It had also become a Category 3 hurricane on October 17. It attained peak intensity on October 18, sustained winds reached . The hurricane weakened slightly before it was last seen on October 19.

Hurricane Eleven 

The Gale of 1878

On October 18 a tropical storm formed west of Jamaica. As it neared landfall in Cuba, it strengthened to a 100 mph (160 km/h) hurricane, but weakened while crossing the island. It passed over southeast Florida and the Bahamas, strengthening to a 100 mph (160 km/h) hurricane again before hitting North Carolina between Wilmington and Morehead City. The hurricane raced across the interior of the United States, becoming extratropical on the 24th over New York. The hurricane caused over $2 million in damage, and at least 72 casualties. These included 19 people killed when a ship, the A.S.Davis, was driven ashore at Virginia Beach. In total, the hurricane was responsible for 22 shipwrecks. Among these was the steamer City of Houston which was lost on Frying Pan Shoals.

Tropical Storm Twelve 

Tropical Storm San Rufo of 1878

A tropical storm was first discovered on November 25 some 700 miles east of the Lesser Antilles. On November 28 and 29 it passed over much of the northern Lesser Antilles. The storm then passed near the southern coast of Puerto Rico and its effects were felt in southeastern and southern Puerto Rico. It was first known tropical storm to impact Puerto Rico in November. Sustained winds of 70+mph. Later on it continued into the Caribbean and dissipated on December 2 while a few hundred miles south of Jamaica.

This is the earliest known tropical cyclone to exist in the month of December on record, though most of its life spanned in November.

See also

Tropical cyclone observation
Atlantic hurricane reanalysis project

References

Sources

External links

 
Atlantic Hurricane Season, 1878
Articles which contain graphical timelines
1878 natural disasters